Carl Engel (1883–1944), was an American pianist.

Carl Engel may also refer to:

Carl Engel (musicologist) (1818–1882), an English musicologist
Carl Ludvig Engel (1778–1840), a German architect

See also
Carl Engel von der Rabenau (1817–1870), a German painter
Karl Engel (Austrian footballer)
Karl Engel (Swiss footballer)